In mathematics, specifically group theory, a subgroup  of a group  may be used to decompose the underlying set of  into disjoint, equal-size subsets called cosets. There are left cosets and right cosets. Cosets (both left and right) have the same number of elements (cardinality) as does . Furthermore,  itself is both a left coset and a right coset.

Cosets of a particular type of subgroup (a normal subgroup) can be used as the elements of another group called a quotient group or factor group. Cosets also appear in other areas of mathematics such as vector spaces and error-correcting codes.

Definition
Let  be a subgroup of the group  whose operation is written multiplicatively (juxtaposition denotes the group operation). In symbols these are,

The right cosets are defined similarly, except that the element  is now a right factor, that is,

As  varies through the group, it would appear that many cosets (right or left) would be generated. Nevertheless, it turns out that any two left cosets (respectively right cosets) are either disjoint or are identical as sets.

First example
Let  be the dihedral group of order six. This is enough information to fill in the entire Cayley table:

Let  be the subgroup .
,
, and
.
Since all the elements of  have now appeared in one of these cosets, generating any more can not give new cosets, since a new coset would have to have an element in common with one of these and therefore be identical to one of these cosets. For instance, .

,
 , and
.

Let  be the subgroup .

Let  be a subgroup of a group  and suppose that , . The following statements are equivalent:

Properties

The disjointness of non-identical cosets is a result of the fact that if  belongs to  then . For if  then there must exist an  such that . Thus .

Two elements being in the same left coset also provide a natural equivalence relation. As with any set of equivalence classes, they form a partition of the underlying set. A coset representative is a representative in the equivalence class sense. A set of representatives of all the cosets is called a transversal. There are other types of equivalence relations in a group, such as conjugacy, that form different classes which do not have the properties discussed here.

Similar statements apply to right cosets.

Normal subgroups
A subgroup  of a group  is a normal subgroup of  if and only if for all elements  of  the corresponding left and right cosets are equal, that is, . This is the case for the subgroup  in the first example above.

This is illustrated by the subgroup  in the first example above. (Some cosets may coincide.

Since every right coset is a left coset, there is no need to distinguish "left cosets" from "right cosets".

Index of a subgroup

Every left or right coset of  has the same number of elements (or cardinality in the case of an infinite ) as  itself.

This equation also holds in the case where the groups are infinite, although the meaning may be less clear.

More examples

Integers
Let  be the additive group of the integers,  and  the subgroup . (The same argument shows that every subgroup of an Abelian group is normal.)

This example may be generalized. Again let  be the additive group of the integers, and now let  the subgroup , where  is a positive integer. There are no more than  cosets, because . The coset  is the congruence class of  modulo .

Vectors
Another example of a coset comes from the theory of vector spaces. The elements (vectors) of a vector space form an abelian group under vector addition. The subspaces of the vector space are subgroups of this group.

are called affine subspaces, and are cosets (both left and right, since the group is abelian). In terms of 3-dimensional geometric vectors, these affine subspaces are all the "lines" or "planes" parallel to the subspace, which is a line or plane going through the origin. For example, consider the plane . If  is a line through the origin , then  is a subgroup of the abelian group .

Matrices
Let  be the multiplicative group of matrices,

For a fixed element of  consider the left coset

That is, the left cosets consist of all the matrices in  having the same upper-left entry.

As orbits of a group action

The orbit of  under the right action is the left coset , while the orbit under the left action is the right coset .

History
The concept of a coset dates back to Galois's work of 1830–31. He introduced a notation but did not provide a name for the concept. The term "co-set" appears for the first time in 1910 in a paper by G. A. Miller in the Quarterly Journal of Mathematics (vol. 41, p. 382). Various other terms have been used including the German Nebengruppen (Weber) and conjugate group (Burnside).

Galois was concerned with deciding when a given polynomial equation was solvable by radicals. Camille Jordan in his commentaries on Galois's work in 1865 and 1869 elaborated on these ideas and defined normal subgroups as we have above, although he did not use this term.

For instance,  would call  a right coset, emphasizing the subgroup being on the right.

An application from coding theory

A binary linear code is an -dimensional subspace  of an -dimensional vector space  over the binary field . As  is an additive abelian group,  is a subgroup of this group. Codes can be used to correct errors that can occur in transmission. When a codeword (element of ) is transmitted some of its bits may be altered in the process and the task of the receiver is to determine the most likely codeword that the corrupted received word could have started out as. This procedure is called decoding and if only a few errors are made in transmission it can be done effectively with only a very few mistakes. A standard array is a coset decomposition of  put into tabular form in a certain way. This element is called a coset leader and there may be some choice in selecting it. Now the process is repeated, a new vector with a minimal number of ones that does not already appear is selected as a new coset leader and the coset of  containing it is the next row. The process ends when all the vectors of  have been sorted into the cosets.

An example of a standard array for the 2-dimensional code  in the 5-dimensional space  (with 32 vectors) is as follows:

The decoding procedure is to find the received word in the table and then add to it the coset leader of the row it is in. In the event that the transmission errors occurred in precisely the non-zero positions of the coset leader the result will be the right codeword. In this example, if a single error occurs, the method will always correct it, since all possible coset leaders with a single one appear in the array.

Syndrome decoding can be used to improve the efficiency of this method. It is a method of computing the correct coset (row) that a received word will be in. To decode, the search is now reduced to finding the coset leader that has the same syndrome as the received word.

Double cosets

Notation

Several authors working with these sets have developed a specialized notation for their work, where

More applications
Cosets are central in the definition of the transfer.
Cosets are important in computational group theory. For example, Thistlethwaite's algorithm for solving Rubik's Cube relies heavily on cosets.

See also
Heap
Coset enumeration

Notes

References

Further reading

External links

Illustrated examples

Group theory

de:Gruppentheorie#Nebenklassen